Jules Labarthe is a cinematographer, film producer and photographer. He studied film at New York University. He met director Jamie Babbit in a coffee shop in Los Angeles and as a result of this meeting was the cinematographer on her 1996 short film Frog Crossing. He has collaborated with Babbit on several other projects including her 1999 feature film But I'm a Cheerleader. He has been the cinematographer on MTV's Undressed and new ABC Family series Greek. He has also produced two short films and one feature, Too Pure (1998).

Filmography

Cinematographer
1996: Frog Crossing (short, dir. Jamie Babbit and Ari Gold)
1998: Stray Bullet (dir. Rob Spera)
1998: Too Pure (dir. Sunmin Park)
1999: The Lovely Leave (short, dir. Claire Stansfield)
1999: Sleeping Beauties (short, dir. Jamie Babbit)
1999: Undressed (TV)
1999: But I'm a Cheerleader (dir. Jamie Babbit)
2000: Turbans (short, dir. Erika S. Andersen)
2004: Going Upriver: The Long War of John Kerry (dir. George Butler)
2004: A Memoir to My Former Self (short, dir. Jamie Babbit)
2007: Greek (TV)

Producer
1998: Too Pure
1999: The Lovely Leave
2000: Turbans

References

External links
Official site

Living people
Year of birth missing (living people)
American cinematographers
American film producers
American photographers
Tisch School of the Arts alumni